Shitalakshya River ( pronounced: Shitalokkha Nodi) (also known as Lakshymā River) is a distributary of the Brahmaputra. A portion of its upper course is known as Banar River or Banor River. In the Shitalakshya's initial stages, it flows in a southwest direction and then east of the city of Narayanganj in central Bangladesh until it merges with the Dhaleswari near Kalagachhiya. Its flow, measured at Demra, has reached . It remains navigable year round. The river flows through Gazipur district forming its border with Narsingdi for some distance and then through Narayanganj District.

Course
The Shitalakhya branches off the Old Brahmaputra and flows through the eastern part of Dhaka District almost parallel to the Old Brahmaputra. It passes by Narayanganj and joins the Dhaleshwari River.

In Van den Brouck's map, the river is marked as Lecki, flowing west of Barrempooter (Brahmaputra). In Van den Brouck's time (1660), it was a large and swift flowing river. It was so till the early 19th century. There, however, are some reservations about the accuracy of Van den Brouck's map.

Historical importance
Sonargaon, a former capital of the region, stood on the banks of the Shitalakhhya. A fort was built by Isa Khan, a former ruler of the area, on its banks. It is believed that it was connected with Lalbagh Fort in Dhaka through a tunnel. Sonakanda Fort, also on the river, was built to counter Magh and Portuguese pirates. There are several historical mosques on its banks – Bandarshahi mosque (built in 1481 by Baba Saleh), Kadam Rasul mosque (containing the footprints of Muhammad), Mariamer masjid (built by Shaista Khan) etc.

Economic importance
The Shitalakshya River was once an important center for the muslin industry. Even today, there are centres of artistic weaving on its banks. There also are a number of industrial units on its banks, including the Adamjee Jute Mills. Thermal power houses are located along the river at Palash (north of Ghorashal) and at Siddhirganj. Industrial affluent dumped into the river resulting in high levels of pollution is a cause for concern.

There is a river port in Narayanganj. Numerous launches move out along the river to different parts of Bangladesh. The government has approved construction of a container terminal on the river Shitalakhya with foreign investment.

References

Rivers of Bangladesh
Distributaries
Rivers of Dhaka Division